Pabra is a lake of Estonia.

See also
 List of lakes of Estonia
 Pabra village in Haryana state of India

Lakes of Estonia